The Tomb of the Unknown Revolutionary War Soldier, also known as the Tomb of the Unknown Soldier of the American Revolution, is a war memorial located within Washington Square in Philadelphia, Pennsylvania. The memorial honors the thousands of soldiers who died during the American Revolutionary War, many of whom were buried in mass graves in the square. The tomb and Washington Square are part of Independence National Historical Park.

The memorial was first conceived in 1954 by the Washington Square Planning Committee, and was completed in 1957.  The monument was designed by architect G. Edwin Brumbaugh and includes an eternal flame and a bronze cast of Jean Antoine Houdon's statue of George Washington as the monument's  centerpiece. The tomb includes remains which were disinterred, after archeological examination, from beneath the square. The remains are that of a soldier, but it is uncertain if he was Colonial or British. An unknown number of bodies were buried beneath the square and the surrounding area. Remains are still occasionally found during construction and maintenance projects.

Engraved in the side of the tomb are these words:
 "Freedom is a light for which many men have died in darkness"
 "The independence and liberty you possess are the work of joint councils and joint efforts of common dangers, suffering and success." (Washington Farewell Address, Sept. 17, 1796)
 "In unmarked graves within this square lie thousands of unknown soldiers of Washington's Army who died of wounds and sickness during the Revolutionary War."

The plaque on the tomb reads:
 "Beneath this stone rests a soldier of Washington's army who died to give you liberty."

Vandalism
On June 12, 2020, the tomb was vandalized when someone spray painted “committed genocide" on the face of the tomb.

See also

 List of public art in Philadelphia
 List of statues of George Washington
 List of sculptures of presidents of the United States
 Pennsylvania in the American Revolution

References

External links

 

1954 establishments in Pennsylvania
1954 sculptures
Buildings and structures completed in 1954
American Revolutionary War monuments and memorials
Bronze sculptures in Pennsylvania
Cemetery vandalism and desecration
Independence National Historical Park
Landmarks in Philadelphia
Monuments and memorials in Philadelphia
Outdoor sculptures in Philadelphia
Sculptures of men in Pennsylvania
Statues in Pennsylvania
Statues of George Washington
Tomb of the Unknowns, Revolution
Tombs in the United States
Vandalized works of art in Pennsylvania
Washington Square West, Philadelphia
Society Hill, Philadelphia